"evergreen" is Hitomi Takahashi's 2nd single under the Sony Records (gr8! records) label. The single was released on August 10, 2005, in one format. This is the second retail single to be released from her first album sympathy.

Overview
"evergreen" is the second single released by Japanese singer, Hitomi Takahashi. The a-side song was used as the first theme song for the Japanese TV drama New Kids War. Though this single did not sell as well as her 1st, it still managed to appear in the Top 30 on the Japanese Oricon Charts and overall almost sold 30,000 copies. "evergreen" is currently her third best selling single in terms of sales.

The title song is a ballad, in which Hitomi sings about how the world changes, but memories will always stay the same. A guitar is used throughout the song, and a piano can also be heard playing during the song. In addition, unlike her previous a-side, the lyrics for "evergreen" were partially penned by Hitomi herself. In contrast, the b-side song, "Bōkensha", is a fast-paced, pop-rock song, which, though it has never appeared on an album, is frequently used during her lives.

Sample of the translated lyrics:
The wet tracks in the twilight
That summer we walked hand in hand is still within me even now
I'll never, never forget
The countless stories you gave me will cross time and we...
Will surely meet again; believe in a miracle...

Music video
The music video for "evergreen" was directed by AT, and was filmed somewhere in Hokkaido. The PV starts with Hitomi walking through a field, the camera only showing her legs. Once the song starts, the first verse and chorus of the PV features a close-up of Hitomi singing with a sunset background behind her. As the PV progresses to the instrumental, another scene emerges with Hitomi in a field with hills in the background. When the instrumental ends, the PV switches between the two scenes. The ending of the PV features two birds flying off into the sky. Also, so far there is no full-length version of the PV.

Track listing
 "evergreen" - 5:19   Lyrics by Hitomi Takahashi & Hidenori Tanaka  Music by Hidenori Tanaka  Arrangement by Tomoji Sogawa 
 "" - 4:11   Lyrics by Hitomi Takahashi & mavie  Music by Hyoei Yasuhara  Arrangement by Hyoei Yasuhara 
 "evergreen -Instrumental-" - 5:19
 "冒険者 -Instrumental- " - 4:11

Personnel
Hitomi Takahashi - vocals, chorus
Yoshihiko Chino - guitars
Tomoji Sogawa - keyboards & apf & programming
Naoya Emi - bass
Masuke Nozaki - drums
Takamichi Tsugei - guitars
Rei Shimizu - bass
Hyoei Yasuhara - keyboards & programming

Production
Producer - Kazuma Jo 
Directors - Kazuma Jo, Taku Sugawara 
Mixing - Eiichi Nishizawa (Studio Rine)
Music Video Director - AT (Hinx Minx)

Performances
August 19, 2005 - Music Fighter
August 20, 2005 - CDTV
August 28, 2005 - Bokura no Ongaku♪LIVE
October 29, 2005 - MUSIC FAIR 21
April 15, 2007 - Sakura · Sakura · SAKURA!

Charts
Oricon Sales Chart (Japan)

References 

2005 singles
evergreen
Songs written by Hitomi Takahashi (singer)
Gr8! Records singles
2005 songs